The United States Census Bureau defines census-designated places as unincorporated communities lacking elected municipal officers and boundaries with legal status.

As of the 2020 census, Kansas has 114 census-designated places, up from 44 in the 2010 census.  While most CDPs in Kansas are small, rural communities, there are also a handful of CDPs included in this list that are inside of Indian Reservations, as well as some military bases. A total of 26,153 people live in Kansas' CDPs, or 0,89% of the population.

Census-designated places

See also
 List of counties in Kansas
 List of townships in Kansas
 List of cities in Kansas
 List of unincorporated communities in Kansas
 List of ghost towns in Kansas
 Lists of places in Kansas
 Kansas locations by per capita income
 Kansas census statistical areas
 Kansas license plate county codes

References 

 
Kansas